Himanta Biswa Sarma was sworn in as Chief Minister of Assam on 10 May 2021, which led to the formation of his ministry and the current Government of Assam. He succeeded his colleague Sarbananda Sonowal. He was administered the oath by Governor Jagdish Mukhi. Himanta Biswa Sarma became the 15th Chief Minister of Assam. BJP national president JP Nadda and other leaders were also present at the ceremony.

Several Chief Ministers of northeastern states attended the swearing-in ceremony of Assam Chief Minister Himanta Biswa Sarma.Those present included Chief Minister of Tripura Biplab Deb, Meghalaya's Conrad Sangma, Manipur's N. Biren Singh, and Nagaland's Neiphiu Rio. Several other dignitaries were also present including the former Chief Minister Sarbananda Sonowal was also present.

Himanta Biswa Sarma was elected unanimously by the Bharatiya Janata Party Legislature Party, which met in Guwahati on Sunday 9 May 2021.The newly-elected Chief Minister began his day by offering prayers at Doul Gobinda Temple and Kamakhya Temple and sought the blessings of the people of his constituency Jalukbari 

After that, he headed for the swearing-in ceremony. Known to have played a pivotal role in the BJP's growing footprint in the Northeast, Sarma left the Congress in 2015 despite being close to Chief Minister Tarun Gogoi as he felt sidelined. The minister's popularity has been key in the National Democratic Alliance's victory in the Assembly polls in Assam with the alliance returning to power overcoming the stiff challenge posed by the Congress-led alliance.

The Bharatiya Janata Party-led NDA secured a comfortable majority in Assam winning 75 seats of the total 126 constituencies. While BJP secured 60 seats, about 48 percent, its allies Asom Gana Parishad and United People's Party Liberal bagged 9 and 6 seats respectively.

Council of Ministers

|}

References

Lists of current Indian state and territorial ministries
Assam ministries
Bharatiya Janata Party state ministries
2021 in Indian politics
2021 establishments in Assam
Cabinets established in 2021
Asom Gana Parishad
United People's Party Liberal
Sarma